Nanobubon is a genus of flowering plants belonging to the family Apiaceae.

Its native range is South Africa.

Species
Species:

Nanobubon capillaceum 
Nanobubon hypogaeum 
Nanobubon strictum

References

Apioideae
Apioideae genera